Saint Joseph's College (SJC; colloquially, Saint Joe) is an unaccredited private Catholic college in Rensselaer, Indiana. It was founded in 1889 and suspended academic operations in 2017 with approximately 1,100 students enrolled. In 2021, the college began offering some courses and certifications at the Rensselaer campus in the fields of business management, cybersecurity, and health science.

History

The college was founded in 1889 by Father Joseph A. Stephan, a missionary from Germany as a secondary school to educate Native Americans. In 1962, President Eisenhower dedicated the Halleck Center (named after Republican representative Charles Halleck).

From 1944 to 1974, the Chicago Bears held their training camp at Saint Joseph's College. The 1971 film Brian's Song—about Brian Piccolo, a Chicago Bears running back who died from carcinoma in the 1970s—was filmed on campus. A charity game for Joy Piccolo, with the Bears versus college all-stars, was played on July 23, 1971. During training camp one year, Hall of Fame linebacker Dick Butkus was reportedly seen out on a tractor in the cornfield adjacent to the campus. The college football all-star game was played at the college's football stadium, Alumni Stadium, for many years.

The main academic building burned to the ground on February 3, 1973. At the time, many thought the fire would close the school, but the school recovered.

After much discussion, on February 3, 2017, college administrators announced that the college would close at the end of the 2016–17 academic year, as the college needed $100 million to continue operating: $27 million in debt, $35 million in infrastructure improvements, and $38 million to "re-engineer" the college. Outgoing president Robert Pastoor noted hopes of reopening, although his resignation was to take effect in May 2017. Three months later, administrators also announced that they were resigning the college's accreditation with the Higher Learning Commission.

In October 2018, it was announced that St. Joseph's would reopen as a junior college in July 2019 through a partnership with Marian University. The college would first begin operations in Indianapolis, where Marian University is located, under the name Saint Joseph's College of Marian University-Indianapolis and could later restart operations at its Rensselaer campus. One year later, resignations of a number of key members of the administrative team and board raised questions about the future viability of the closed Rensselaer Campus, further dimming the hopes of former alumni and the local community. However, in February 2020 the college announced a plan to resume some classes and academic operations in partnership with other colleges and universities beginning in the fall of 2021.

Campus 

The campus has several distinctive features. The Romanesque-style Chapel and the reflecting pond in front of the Chapel are the most recognized features of campus. Drexel Hall was one of the first buildings on campus, and is distinctive for its unique atrium. Drexel has been renovated and restored to its historical appearance. The campus also includes a private recreational lake which is an old stone quarry.

Academics 
Prior to its closure and reopening, the college was accredited by the Higher Learning Commission (HLC). Specific programs were accredited or approved by the National Council for Accreditation of Teacher Education (NCATE), the National League for Nursing (NLN), the Board of Commissioners of the International Assembly of Collegiate Business Education (IACBE), and the State of Indiana Professional Standards Board for the Training of Elementary Teachers.

Saint Joseph's College was known for its Core Program under which students learned the basics of history, political science, natural science, literature and philosophy in integrated "core classes". This departs from the cafeteria-style approach to general education used by most colleges and universities in which students take discrete lower division classes in these subjects. However, credits for “core classes” were non-transferable to other colleges and universities.

Saint Joseph's College had a student-faculty ratio of 14:1. 69% of full-time faculty at Saint Joseph's had their doctorates or terminal degree. SJC offers 75 major, minor, and pre-professional programs, along with the nationally acclaimed Core Curriculum, which provides a solid liberal arts education and a distinct career advantage.

Student life 
Like most other Indiana colleges, SJC held an annual "Little 500" race. Unlike the bed or bicycle races held elsewhere, Saint Joseph's College staged a go-kart race in the same manner as Purdue University's Grand Prix, albeit on a much smaller scale. The event was popular and brought alumni back to the school every year.

Athletics
Saint Joseph's College competed in NCAA Division II athletics and was a member of the Great Lakes Valley Conference (GLVC). The school mascot was the Puma. It is the only post-secondary institution in the United States with the Puma as its mascot, although several have mountain lions, which is a different name for the same species.

In 1956, the Saint Joseph's football team won a share of the NAIA Football National Championship, playing Montana State to a 0–0 tie in the Aluminum Bowl at War Memorial Stadium in Little Rock, Arkansas. The Pumas won six Indiana Collegiate Conference titles; 1955 co-champions, 1956, 1957, 1971, 1976 co-champions and 1977 co-champions. The football team had been dominant in their conference near its final years, winning the Great Lakes Football Conference championship in 2006, 2009 and 2010.

The school's baseball team was runner-up to the NCAA Division II Baseball Championship in 1996, lead by pitcher Rick O'Dette, who would later be drafted by the Boston Red Sox in the 1997 MLB Draft (15th Round). The same year, the women's soccer team was the runner-up in the NCAA Division II Women's Soccer Championship. The school's women's tennis team has captured six GLVC conference titles since 1985 and completed three undefeated seasons.

In 2010, the men's basketball team led by head coach Richard Davis put together a string of three wins in the NCAA Division II men's basketball tournament to reach the Elite Eight for the second time in school history.

Notable people

Major League Baseball Hall of Fame player Gil Hodges played college basketball and baseball at Saint Joseph's College, and later went on to play for the Brooklyn and Los Angeles Dodgers and the New York Mets. The Mets traded him to the Washington Senators, he retired and became the Senators manager. Following 5 seasons in Washington (1963–67), he returned to New York and led the Mets to their first World Series title in 1969. The baseball field is named in his honor.
Philip F. Deaver, writer and poet, graduated from St. Joseph's College in 1968. He went on to win O. Henry and Flannery O'Connor awards for short fiction, and to publish poetry and fiction in dozens of literary journals.
 Former Canadian Member of Parliament and Speaker of the House of Commons of Canada Gilbert Parent.
 Former Chicago Alderman Edward Vrdolyak
 National Football League player John McGarry.
 Current Ohio State University women's basketball coach Kevin McGuff
 Mark S. Doss, Grammy Award-winning African-American bass-baritone, specializing in opera, concert and recital.
 J. Patrick Lewis, American poet and prose writer noted for his children's poems and other light verse.
 Michael Y. Scudder, American lawyer and Seventh Circuit judge.
 Jake Teshka, member of the Indiana House of Representatives

References

External links

 
Saint Joseph's College Archives

 
Buildings and structures in Jasper County, Indiana
Education in Jasper County, Indiana
Educational institutions established in 1889
Catholic universities and colleges in Indiana

1889 establishments in Indiana
Missionaries of the Precious Blood
Marian University (Indiana)

Defunct private universities and colleges in Indiana
Defunct Catholic universities and colleges in the United States